The U.S. state of Oregon has large wind energy resources. Many projects have been completed, most of them in rural Eastern Oregon and near the Columbia River Gorge. Wind power accounted for 12.1% of the electricity generated in Oregon in 2016.

Legislative actions
Laws passed by the Oregon Legislative Assembly in 1999 and 2007 have aimed to encourage both small and large wind projects. Oregon passed a net metering law in 1999 that helped encourage installation of small wind power systems. As of 2008, a handful of Oregonians have installed small-scale wind-power systems to reduce their carbon footprint.

Under Senate Bill 838, wind, solar, geothermal and other types of renewable power must account for 25 percent of an electric utility's retail sales by 2025. Intermediate requirements set the standard at 5 percent by 2011, climbing gradually until 2025.

In 2016, Oregon's RPS requirement target was raised to 50%, as two companies must supply 50% of Oregon's power as renewable by 2040. The US Energy Information Administration expects this to increase windpower in Oregon, as older hydropower is exported to California and not eligible for the RPS.

Companies
Vestas, the largest wind turbine manufacturer in the world as of 2009, has its North American headquarters in Portland.  Iberdrola Renovables, one of the larger wind farm operators, also bases their American offices in Portland.

Capacity

Potential
Estimates from the National Renewable Energy Laboratory showed that Oregon has potential to install over 27,000 megawatts of onshore wind power. The offshore wind potential is estimated at 225,000 MW, and would be capable of generating 962,723 million kWh.

Installed growth
Installed wind power capacity in Oregon saw large growth from 2007 to 2012. Oregon ranks among the top ten states with the most wind power installed. Climbing from 1 percent in the early 2000s (decade), wind power accounted for 12.4 percent of total electricity generated in Oregon during 2013.

In 2009, 691 MW of wind-powered capacity was added in Oregon, the fourth biggest increase in the U.S. that year.

Notable projects

In 2009 GE Wind Energy was awarded a $1.48 billion contract to build the Shepherds Flat Wind Farm. The 845-megawatt project uses over 300 turbines and spans across  of Gilliam and Morrow Counties in north-central Oregon. When it was completed in September 2012, it became the largest wind farm in Oregon, and the second largest in the world, although many larger ones are planned. It was completed in 2012 to take advantage of the 2.2 cent/kWh Production Tax Credit.

Conflicts
About four gigawatts of new wind energy development in Eastern Oregon and Washington has not been built due to the interference it could cause with aviation radar.  The radar in Fossil was upgraded in June 2015 to stop "radar clutter" caused by nearby wind farms.

Generation

Source:

See also

Solar power in Oregon
Energy in Oregon
Wind power in the United States
Renewable energy in the United States

References

External links

Northwest Wind Industry Alliance (NWIA) official webpage
Energy Efficiency and Renewable Energy in Oregon
U.S. Wind Energy Projects - Oregon
Oregon Wind Activities